"A Life Less Ordinary" was a non-album single released by the band Ash on 13 October 1997. It was the title track of the film of the same name, A Life Less Ordinary, starring Cameron Diaz and Ewan McGregor, and also appeared on the film's soundtrack. The single was released in three formats: CD, 7-inch vinyl, and cassette. The limited-edition 7-inch was printed on blue vinyl. The song peaked at number ten on the UK Singles Chart.

The band was personally requested for by the director of the film, Danny Boyle. This was also the first song to feature their new guitarist Charlotte Hatherley.

The song had the working title of "Film Song" and Wheeler has said of the lyrics: 'This is a song about my muse. Robert Graves wrote a book called 'White Goddess' about the goddess of poetry, which is a concept that goes back to the ancient Greeks. Maybe this makes me sound completely mad, but I have this thing about music coming from a higher place. So, I was writing a song about the goddess. It's a weird love song. It says how I'd sell my soul for something to believe in, something more significant than everyday life.'.

The song was remixed in a slightly heavier fashion for the Japanese and US versions of Nu-Clear Sounds.

B-sides
The first B-side, "What Deaner was Talking About," is a cover of the song by Ween from the album Chocolate and Cheese. This track also features on Ash's live album Live at the Wireless.

The B-side "Where is Our Love Going?" is more of an example of the music Ash used to make in their Trailer then where they were heading for in Nu-Clear Sounds. It's a fast-paced number, which later appeared on the Cosmic Debris B-sides collection.

The (CD only) track, "Halloween" also appears on Cosmic Debris, but is a much slower paced story, telling a tale of loneliness on Halloween night until finally reuniting with his friends at the end of the song. The track was originally called "Happy Halloween".

Music video
The directors Hammer & Tongs directed the video for the single, which consists of the band playing on a race-track inside a heart-shaped area marked with crash barriers. Four cars appear and crash into the band. The cars race forward with the band still playing the song on the bonnets of the cars. Towards the end, the cars crash into each other throwing one over the top. However, the cars land perfectly and race off into the distance out of view. Of course, this being the soundtrack to the film of the same name, footage from the film is occasionally cut to. Rick was taken ill with bronchitis during the filming of this video, which explains why after the first few shots of him at the start, he has his hood up for the rest of the video. This was in fact a crew member filling in for him.

Track listings
UK and European CD single
 "A Life Less Ordinary" (Wheeler)
 "What Deaner was Talking About" (Ween)
 "Where Is Our Love Going?" (Wheeler)
 "Halloween" (Wheeler)

UK 7-inch and cassette single
 "A Life Less Ordinary" (Wheeler)
 "Where Is Our Love Going?" (Wheeler)
 "What Deaner was Talking About" (Ween)

Charts

References

 http://walking-barefoot.com

External links
 

1997 songs
1997 singles
Ash (band) songs
Film theme songs
Songs written by Tim Wheeler
Songs written for films
Infectious Records singles